The following lists events that happened during 1853 in Australia.

Incumbents

Governors
Governors of the Australian colonies:
Governor of New South Wales - Sir Charles Augustus FitzRoy
Governor of South Australia - Sir Henry Young
Governor of Tasmania - Sir William Denison
Lieutenant-Governor of Victoria - Charles La Trobe
Governor of Western Australia as a Crown Colony - Captain Charles Fitzgerald

Events
This was a year of intense political agitation by miners on the Victorian goldfields.

8 January - Victoria Police formally established by Act of Parliament
22 January - University of Melbourne formally established by Act of Parliament
17 March - St Kilda Road robberies
1 August - The Bendigo Petition, 30 metres long with at least 23,000 signatures requesting reform of the license fee system that applied to miners on the gold fields, was sent to Governor La Trobe in Melbourne.
10 August - A Jubilee Festival was held in Hobart to mark the cessation of convict transportation to the colony.
15 August - the term Bunyip aristocracy was coined by Daniel Deniehy in a speech attacking the proposal by William Wentworth to create a system of hereditary peerage in Australia
3 October - Illawarra Steam Navigation Company incorporated
1 November - The first postage stamps of Tasmania are issued.
December - Victoria Police Gazette first published
Hardy Wine Company established

Exploration and settlement
European settlement began at:
Cleve, South Australia
Dongara, Western Australia
Nailsworth, South Australia

Science and technology
10 January - the Adelaide Philosophical Society founded, predecessor of the Royal Society of South Australia

Sport
23 September - occupancy of the present site of the Melbourne Cricket Ground, which was part of a 'police paddock', was given to the Melbourne Cricket Club by Lieutenant Governor Charles La Trobe. This followed the forced resumption of land from the then-15-year-old Club to build Australia's first steam train railway.

Births

 1 February – George Cruickshank, New South Wales politician (d. 1904)
 18 February – Archibald James Campbell, public servant, ornithologist and naturalist (d. 1929)
 13 May – Vaiben Louis Solomon, 21st Premier of South Australia (d. 1908)
 7 July – Charles Douglas Richardson, sculpture and painter (born in the United Kingdom) (d. 1932)
 30 July – Frederick Deeming, murderer (born in the United Kingdom) (d. 1892)
 8 August – Alexander Poynton, South Australian politician (d. 1935)
 9 September – Frederick Spofforth, cricketer (d. 1926)
 5 October – Leonard Rodway, dentist and botanist (born in the United Kingdom) (d. 1936)

Deaths

 1 January – Gregory Blaxland, farmer and explorer (born in the United Kingdom) (b. 1778)
 20 February – William Broughton, bishop (born and died in the United Kingdom) (b. 1788)
 11 June – Francis Barrallier, explorer (born in France and died in the United Kingdom) (b. 1773)
 3 November – Daniel Cooper, merchant, financier and shipowner (born and died in the United Kingdom) (b. 1785)

References

 
Australia
Years of the 19th century in Australia